Presidential elections were held in Kiribati on 17 October 2007, following the 2007 parliamentary election. President Anote Tong, who was re-elected to parliament in the first round of the parliamentary election, sought another term as president. At the first parliamentary session, four candidates were chosen to appear on the ballot: Anote Tong, Patrick Tatireta, Timon Aneri, and Nabuti Mwemwenikarawa. Opposition nominees Harry Tong (Anote Tong's brother) and Tetaua Taitai were excluded from the ballot, upon which the opposition called for a boycott of the election.

Consequently, voter turnout was just above 50%. Tong received more than 15,500 votes, Mwemwenikarawa received over 8,000 votes, and Tatireta and Anera received less than 400 votes each.

Results

References

Presidential elections in Kiribati
Kiribati
Presidential election